Khalid Tawfik Lazim (born 9 March 1944) is an Iraqi sprinter. He competed in the men's 4 × 100 metres relay at the 1964 Summer Olympics.

References

1944 births
Living people
Athletes (track and field) at the 1964 Summer Olympics
Iraqi male sprinters
Olympic athletes of Iraq
Place of birth missing (living people)